Aleksandr Viktorovich Zbruyev (born 31 March 1938, in Moscow, Soviet Union) is Soviet and Russian theatrical and cinema actor.

Selected filmography
 My Younger Brother (1962) as Dimka Denisov
 A Span of Earth (1964) as Aleksandr Motovilov
 Clean Ponds (1965) as Sergei
 Big School-Break (1972) as Grigoriy Ganzha
 A Lover's Romance (1974) as Igor Volgin
 Melodies of a White Night (1976) as Fyodor
 The House That Swift Built (1982) as Relb, Lilliputian
 Guard Me, My Talisman (1986) as Mitya
 Tracker (1987) as Yakov Pyatkin
 To Kill a Dragon (1988) as Friedrichsen
 Black Rose Is an Emblem of Sorrow, Red Rose Is an Emblem of Love (1989) as Ilya
 The Inner Circle (1991) as Stalin
 You Are My Only Love (1993) as Timoshin
 Maestro Thief (1994) as Vladimir Beletsky
 Everything Will Be Fine! (1995) as Konstantin Smirnov
 Poor Sasha (1997)  as Beryozkin
 Northern Lights (2001) as Sergey
 Balakirev the Buffoon (2002) as Yaguzhinskiy
 The Film About Alekseyev (2014) as Alexeyev
 Gold Diggers (2019) as Pyotr Sergeevich

References

External links

1938 births
Living people
Russian male actors
Soviet male actors
Academicians of the National Academy of Motion Picture Arts and Sciences of Russia
Recipients of the Order "For Merit to the Fatherland", 3rd class
Recipients of the Order "For Merit to the Fatherland", 4th class

Recipients of the Order of Honour (Russia)
People's Artists of the RSFSR
State Prize of the Russian Federation laureates